The politics of the Federated States of Micronesia (FSM) takes place in a framework of a federal assembly-independent representative democratic republic. The President of the Federated States of Micronesia is both head of state and head of government. Executive power is exercised by the president and his cabinet, while legislative power is vested in both the president and the Congress. The judiciary is independent of the executive and the legislature.

The internal workings of the FSM are governed by the 1979 constitution, which guarantees fundamental human rights and establishes a separation of governmental powers. The Federation is in free association with the United States; the Compact of Free Association entered into force 3 November 1986.

Executive branch

The president and the vice president are elected by Congress from among the four senators-at-large for four-year terms. The president is both the chief of state and head of government. Their congressional seats are then filled by special elections. The president and vice president are supported by an appointed cabinet.

Cabinet 
The President and Vice President are supported in the administration by a Cabinet made up of 9 appointed officials. They are: the Secretaries of the Department of Environment, Climate Change & Emergency Management (DECEM), the Department of Justice (DOJ), the Department of  Foreign Affairs (Foreign Affairs), the Department of Resource & Development (R&D), the Department of Health & Social Affairs (DHSA), the Department of Transportation, Communications, & Infrastructure (TC&I), and the Department of Education (DOE); the heads of the Office of the Public Defender, Office of National Archives, Culture, & Historic Preservations, and FSM Postal Services. Other Cabinet-level officials include the director of the National Oceanic Resource & Maritime Authority, Coconut Development Authority, FSM Banking Board, and National Fisheries Corporation.

Legislative branch
The Congress has fourteen non-partisan members, ten members elected for a two-year term in single-seat constituencies and four members elected for a four-year term, one from each state at large.

Judicial branch 
The judiciary is headed by the Supreme Court of the Federated States of Micronesia, which is divided into trial and appellate divisions. The president appoints judges with the advice and consent of the Congress. Andon Amaraich was Chief Justice of the Federated States of Micronesia until his death in January 2010.  He was succeeded by Martin G. Yinug, who served until his death on August 31, 2014. He was succeeded by Dennis K. Yamase, who continues to serve as Chief Justice of the Supreme Court since his investiture on October 2, 2015.

Political parties and elections
A head of state (the President) and a legislature are elected on a national level. At the 2011 election, only non-partisans have been elected. The president is elected for a four-year term by Congress. There are no political parties in Micronesia, though they are not banned. Political allegiances depend mainly on family and island-related factors.

Government Agencies
The government of Micronesia includes national agencies to serve the Micronesian people. The FSM Social Security Administration, FSM Telecommunications Corporation, Office of the Public Auditor, and FSM PetroCorp are independent agencies.

Administrative divisions
The FSM is divided in four states: Chuuk (Truk), Kosrae, Pohnpei, and Yap. Each has its own constitution, elected legislature, governor, and lieutenant governor. The state governments maintain considerable power, particularly regarding the implementation of budgetary policies.

International organization participation
Micronesia is a member of the following international organizations:

 Alliance of Small Island States
 Asian Development Bank
 U.N. Economic and Social Commission for Asia and the Pacific
 Group of 77
 International Civil Aviation Organization
 International Bank for Reconstruction and Development
 International Development Association
 International Finance Corporation
 International Monetary Fund
 Intelsat
 International Olympic Committee
 International Telecommunication Union
 Organization for the Prohibition of Chemical Weapons
 Pacific Islands Forum
 South Pacific Regional Trade and Economic Co-operation Agreement
 Pacific Community (SPC)
 United Nations
 U.N. Conference on Trade and Development
 World Health Organization
 World Meteorological Organization

See also
 List of diplomatic missions in the Federated States of Micronesia

References

External links
Government
 Government of the Federated States of Micronesia
Adam Carr's Election Archive

 
Micronesia, Federated States Of